Malek Afsary is a Bangladeshi Film Director, who has directed 24 films till date. Malek Afsary began his career as an 'Assistant Director' to the 'Film Director' in the early 1970s. He made his 'film debut' as an 'Assistant Director' in the film 'Piyasi Mon'. He then wrote the 'story' for the film 'Lutera' and the 'dialogue' for the film 'Kar Pape'. He made his 'directorial debut' in 1983 with the film 'Ghorer Bou'. He is best known for his film 'Ei Ghor Ei Songshar' in 1996 and 'Password' in 2019.

Biography
His directorial debut was the 1983 film Ghorer Bou. He married actress Rosy Samad in 1981. He married again after the demise of his 1st wife Rosy Afsary.

Filmography 
He achieved fame directing salman shah featured Ei Ghor Ei Songshar (1996). He then went on to make films like Hira Chuni Panna (2000), Thekao Mastan (2001), Ulta Palta 69 (2007), Moner Jala (2011), Full and Final (2013), Antor Jala (2017), and Password (2019).

As a director
 Ghorer Bou (1983)
 Geet (1984)
 Golmaal (1986)
 Rastar Raja (1986)
 Dhoni Gorib (1987)
 Khati Puron (1989)
 Sonar Songshar (1989)
 Khoma (1992)
 Grina (1994)
 Durjoy (1996)
 Ei Ghor Ei Songshar (1996)
 Mrittur Mukhe (1998)
 Laal Baadshah (1999)
 Moron Kamor (1999)
 Raja (1999)
 Hira Chuni Panna (2000)
 Thekao Mastan (2001)
 Boma Hamla (2002)
 Ami Jail Theke Bolchi (2005)
 Ulta Palta 69 (2007)
 Moner Jala (2011)
 Full and Final (2013)
 Antor Jala (2017)
 Password (2019)

As a producer 
 Ei Ghor Ei Songsar (1996)
 Moron Kamor (1999)
 Hira Chuni Panna (2000)
 Thekao Mastan (2001)
 Ulta Palta 69 (2007)

References

External links
 
 
 Malek Afsari on BMDb

Bangladeshi film directors
People from Noakhali District
1951 births
Living people